The PSB Paris School of Business (formerly ESG Management School) is a business school in Paris and Rennes (France) offering BBA, MBA, MSc, MIM, DBA, and executive education courses in English and French. The school is part of Groupe ESG, a network of seven business schools in Paris with a combined alumni of 26,000.

Presentation

PSB Paris School of Business is the international school of Groupe ESG. Located in Paris and Rennes, the school provides both typical French higher education programs and offers courses entirely taught in English. There are more than 3000 students in the school, from Bachelor to Doctorate.

Programmes

BBA 
PSB Paris School of Business’ BBA is a 3-year bachelor's degree focused on management fundamentals. The Bachelor of Business Administration is the standard undergraduate business degree offered in the Anglo-Saxon international business world. The programs of the PSB Paris School of Business are internationally recognized. The BBA is taught entirely in English by a faculty coming from all over the world. Majors are: Marketing, Management, Finance & Accounting.

M.Sc. 
The M.Sc. is a program mainly oriented towards international business studies. Courses include geopolitical studies, cross-cultural management, and international business studies. Students have the possibility to spend one term in China or India and also participate in commando training with Naval Special Forces. Students spend the final trimester working on an international consultancy project.

International MBA 
The International MBA is an 18-month course, where students firstly acquire general business and management skills, followed by the fundamentals of successful and effective decision making. It is internationally accredited by the AMBA and the IACBE, and ranked by SMBG Eduniversal and International MBA Forum, as one of the top ten full-time MBA programs in France.
Students who have majored in Finance are involved in managing the assets of their organizations or in tracking and influencing the exchange of currencies and stocks. Students who have specialized in Marketing regularly pursue careers in consumer goods, luxury, retail, entertainment, media, hi-tech, and pharmaceutical industries.

MBA in Arts and Cultural Management 
In partnership with the Arts School Institut d’Etudes Supérieures des Arts (IESA), this program is for professionals wishing to complete their management training and gain specialization in Arts and Culture. It is a full-time 18-month program, with guest speakers and professional projects, and two intakes in Fall and Spring. MBA in Arts & Cultural Management students go on to work in arts commerce, theater direction, exhibition management, film, and event planning.

MBA in Luxury and Fashion Management 
This MBA program is a 12-month degree for industry professionals. Students acquire knowledge of history, luxury markets, and fashion, as well as French savoir-faire, to complement their professional experience. They do field trips to Italy, Basel, Bordeaux, Reims (Champagne), to learn about emerging and existing luxury markets. Students with an MBA in Luxury & Fashion Management go on to work as International Brand Directors, International Product Managers, International Purchase Managers in Luxury Goods, International Luxury Business Development Managers, Buyers, and Fashion Consultants.

Executive DBA 
PSB Paris School of Business offers a part-time 3-year Doctorate program based on applied research and personalized tutoring, available across many fields.  The aim of this program is to broaden the students' personal and professional horizons by encompassing careers that are in the highest echelons of the corporate and business and academic worlds. Many Executive DBA graduates become faculty members of top international universities and business schools alike, or Corporate Directors, Executive Directors, Diplomats, Journalists, Authors, Chairmen of Boards, or International Policymakers.

Accreditations and Rankings
Accreditations for PSB Paris School of Business are CIMA (Chartered Institute of Management Accountants), PMI (Project Management Institute), AMBA, and CGE. In 2019, Master in Management, the Grande Ecole Master Programme, has received the EPAS accreditation.  As of February 2020, the school obtained the AACSB accreditation.

In 2022, the Financial Times ranks the Masters in Management program 95th in the world. The MBA programs have received recognition from SMBG Eduniversal in 2011 which ranked its full-time MBA program number 8 among those in France requiring no work experience and from CEO Magazine (the magazine publication of International Graduate Forum) in 2012 which ranked it as a "tier one" MBA school.

International Partnerships
Students of the International MBA program can optionally include a period of study at a number of partner institutions, including

 Clark University, United States
 Griffith University, Australia
 Macquarie University, Australia
 Suffolk University, United States
 Tel Aviv University, Israel
 Universidad Anáhuac del Sur, Mexico
 University of Arizona, United States

Publications
The PSB Paris School of Business has also published a series of three books on business management with the L'Harmattan collection called "Un autre regard" which can be translated as "Another look" or "A different perspective".

Notable teacher 
 Frédéric Encel, French writer and scholar of geopolitics

References

External links
 Paris School of Business
 International Assembly for Collegiate Business Education
 Répertoire National des Certifications Professionnelles (RNCP)
 Galileo Global Education
 Groupe ESG

Business schools in France
Education in Paris
Education in Rennes
Educational institutions established in 1974